Gasht-e Gurab (also Romanized as Gasht-e Gūrāb) is a village in Gasht Rural District, in the Central District of Fuman County, Gilan Province, Iran. At the 2006 census, its population was 386, in 104 families.

References 

Populated places in Fuman County